LLH may refer to
 Hospitals
 Life-Line Hospital, a hospital in Damak of Jhapa, Nepal
 LLH Hospital, one of the hospitals in the United Arab Emirates
 Schools
 Las Lomas High School, a school in Walnut Creek, California
 Los Lunas High School, a school in  Valencia County, New Mexico
 Lycée La Liberté Héliopolis, a school in Cairo, Egypt
 Other meanings
 Holin LLH family, a group of transporters in bacteria
 Landsforeningen for lesbiske, homofile, bifile og transpersoner, the former name of the National Association for Lesbians, Gays, Bisexuals and Transgender People, a Norwegian organization
 La Lima Airport, an airport serving the town of La Lima in Cortés Department, Honduras, with the IATA airport code LLH

Long Live Helena